Shreve City is the area of Shreveport located between the Shreveport-Barksdale bridge and East Kings highway. Shreve City currently houses the neighborhoods of Shreve Island, Broadmoor, and South Broadmoor; between these small neighborhoods is the newly remodeled Shreve City shopping city which includes a new Wal-Mart Super Center, Burlington Coat Factory and other small stores. The Shreve City area also contains a street named after Captain Shreve, after whom the city of Shreveport is also named. The Shreve City area is also a large gathering place for the Mardi Gras parades in Shreveport, running down the route of the Shreveport-Barksdale Highway.

Neighborhoods Near Shreve City

Businesses in Shreve City
Anytime Fitness
Bao Bao Food Market
Big Lots
Burlington Coat Factory
Capital One
Church's Chicken
Circle K
Daiquiri Express
El Jimador Supremo
Exxon
Firestone Complete Auto Care
Gateway Tire & Service Center
Goodwill Industries
Jean Simpson Personnel Services
Kim's Chicken and Waffles
Legacy Dance Studio
McDonald's (24 Hours)
New To You Boutique
Picadilly
Pizza Hut
Podnuh's BBQ
Scrubs Unlimited
Skent n Dent
Sonic Drive-In
Spice & All
Super 1 Foods
Taco Bell
Walmart
Wendy's
What's on Tap
Wingstop
Z Best Cars

Geography of Shreveport, Louisiana